Football in South Korea is run by the Korea Football Association. The association administers the national football team as well as the K League. Football is the most popular sport in South Korea.

Beginning 
In ancient times, Silla, one of Three Kingdoms of Korea, had a ball game called "Chuk-guk" (Hangul: 축국, Hanja: 蹴鞠). Though Chukguk is similar to today’s football in many aspects, it features the distinctive rule that the ball should stay in the air during game play with the net also being mounted at a fixed distance above the ground.
However, Koreans first saw the present version of football in 1882 when British crew members played a game while their vessel, was visiting the Port of Jemulpo.

Regularized football introduction was the time of adoption of football as physical education course at National Seoul Foreign Language School in 1904 and the first official match in Korea was the game between Korea Sports  Club and Korea YMCA at Seoul Dongdaemun Stadium in 1905.

In 1902, after the establishment of a football team at Paichai Academy in Seoul, there was a footballing boom throughout Korea. that saw many football clubs and school teams formed by the 1910s. Also in Seoul, many famous football clubs including unofficial national team Joseon FC were founded between the 1910s and 1920s, and they usually had a rivalry against football clubs in Pyongyang, the second biggest city in Korea. In 1933 Kyungsung FC, named according to then Seoul's name, was formed and it was the only Korean club which won the Emperor's Cup in Japan.

The first Korean national football tournament named All Joseon Football Tournament was held in 1921 after Joseon Sports Council was created in 1920. In 1928, Joseon Referee Association was created. Before the creation of the Joseon Football Association in 1933, two organizations hosted the competitions. The creation of Joseon Football Association led to the establishment of several prominent club sides on the peninsula as Korean football began to enter a different form. The All Joseon Football Tournament, which had until 1932 been a tournament almost exclusively between academic institutions, included a "professional" class from 1933 which, along with the immensely popular Kyungsung–Pyongyang intercity football series, raised interest levels in the sport greatly.

See also 
 History of the South Korea national football team
 List of Korean FA Cup winners
 South Korean football league system
 List of South Korean football champions
 K League

References

External links 
 Shin Myung-chul: Histories of Korean sports by event - Football 
(1), (2), (3), (4), (5), (6), (7), (8), (9), (10), (11), (12), (13), (14)